The black-bellied seedeater (Sporophila melanogaster) is a species of bird in the family Thraupidae.
It is endemic to Brazil.

Its natural habitats are temperate grassland and swamps.
It is threatened by habitat loss.

References

Sporophila
Birds of Brazil
Endemic birds of Brazil
Birds described in 1870
Taxonomy articles created by Polbot